John Wyeth "Red" Marion (March 14, 1914 – March 13, 1975) was briefly an outfielder in American Major League Baseball and a longtime manager at the minor league level. A native of Richburg, South Carolina, he was the older brother of Marty Marion, the longtime star shortstop of the St. Louis Cardinals and former big league skipper.

While Marty played 13 years in the Major Leagues, Red Marion played in only 18 big-league games — four in 1935 and the remainder in 1943 — all for the Washington Senators. A right-handed batter and thrower, he collected five hits in 26 at-bats, for a .179 batting average. He had one double, one home run and two runs batted in.

But he would spend 19 seasons as a manager at the minor league level, beginning in 1940 with the Newport Canners of the Class D Appalachian League. He spent ten years (1946–55) as a pilot in the Boston Red Sox organization, beginning with the Oneonta Red Sox of the Class C Canadian–American League and ending with the Triple-A Louisville Colonels of the American Association. In 1956 he remained at the Louisville helm for a final half-season, even though the Red Sox no longer sponsored the Colonels. He also managed in the farm systems of the Senators and Los Angeles Angels, before retiring after the 1963 campaign.

His career minor league managing record was 1,352 victories and 1,224 defeats, a winning percentage of .525.

In 1975, Red Marion died the day before his 61st birthday in San Jose, California, where he had managed Red Sox and Angels farm teams in the 1950s and 1960s.

References
Johnson, Lloyd, ed., The Minor League Register. Durham, North Carolina: Baseball America, 1994.

External links
Baseball Reference – major league profile
Baseball Reference – minor league career

1914 births
1975 deaths
Albany Senators players
Americus Cardinals players
Baseball players from South Carolina
Birmingham Barons managers
Chattanooga Lookouts managers
Chattanooga Lookouts players
Greenville Spinners players
Louisville Colonels (minor league) managers
Louisville Colonels (minor league) players
Major League Baseball outfielders
Newport Canners players
Oneonta Red Sox players
People from Chester County, South Carolina
Quincy Indians players
St. Paul Saints (AA) players
Trenton Senators players
Utica Braves players
Washington Senators (1901–1960) players